Thirukkalappur is a village in the Udayarpalayam taluk of Ariyalur district, Tamil Nadu, India.

Demographics 

As per the 2001 census, Thirukalappur had a total population of 4785 with 2409 males and 2376 females.

References 

Villages in Ariyalur district